Marten Jozef Geeraerts (1707–1791) was a Flemish historical painter. Born at Antwerp, he was intended for the law, and studied in the Jesuits' College. Preferring art, however, he became a pupil of Abraham Godijn, and was made free of the Guild of St. Luke in 1731. In 1741 he became one of the six directors of the Academy of Antwerp, who filled that office gratuitously. He died at Antwerp in 1791. He excelled in grisaille painting in imitation of bas-reliefs, of which there are the following examples:

Antwerp. Gallery. The Fine Arts. 1760.
Brussels. Gallery. Christ and the Disciples at Bmmaus, The Saviour at the House of Simon the Pharisee, The Sons of Aaron punished by Fire from Heaven, The Woman taken in Adultery, Abraham and Melchisedeck, The Sacrifice of Abraham and The Sacrifice of Eli
Hague. Museum. Autumn.
Lille. Museum. Children with Goat.
Vienna. Gallery. Cupid and Psyche.

Between 1756 and 1760 he produced nine grisaille tromp-l’œil paintings for the abbey church in Cambrai which later became the Cathedral of Notre-Dame-de-Grâce.

References

 

1707 births
1791 deaths
History painters
Painters from Antwerp
Academic staff of the Royal Academy of Fine Arts (Antwerp)
18th-century Flemish painters